Lygidea is a genus of plant bugs in the family Miridae. There are about 10 described species in Lygidea.

Species
 Listronotus distinctus Henderson LS, 1941
 Lygidea annexa (Uhler, 1872)
 Lygidea essigi Van Duzee, 1925
 Lygidea illota (Stål, 1858)
 Lygidea mendax Reuter, 1909 (apple red bug)
 Lygidea obscura Reuter, 1909
 Lygidea rosacea Reuter, 1909
 Lygidea rubecula (Uhler, 1895)
 Lygidea salicis Knight, 1939
 Lygidea viburni Knight, 1923

References

Further reading

 
 
 
 
 
 
 

Miridae genera
Mirini